This is a list of Malagasy writers.

 Elie-Charles Abraham (1919– ), poet
 Victor Georges Andriananjason  (1940– ), musician and non-fiction writer
 Lucile Allorge (born 1937), botanist
 David Jaomanoro (1953– ), poet, short story writer and playwright
 Lucien Xavier Michel Andrianarahinjaka (1929–1997), politician, writer, and poet
 Esther Nirina (1932–2004), poet
 Hajasoa Vololona Picard-Ravololonirina (1956– ), academic, politician and poet
 Jean-Joseph Rabearivelo (1903–1937), poet and novelist  
 Jacques Rabemanajara (1913– ), poet, playwright and politician 
 Raymond William Rabemananjara (1913– ), historian and writer
 Fidelis Justin Rabetsimandranto (1907–1966), novelist and playwright
 Charlotte Arisoa Rafenomanjato (1938– ), writer and translator
 Jean-Luc Raharimanana (1967– ), French-language writer
 Elie Rajaonarison (1951–2010), poet
 Régis Rajemisa-Raolison (1913– ), poet and educator 
 Michèle Rakotoson (1948– ), novelist, short story writer and playwright
 Flavien Ranaivo (1914–1999), poet and writer 
Esther Razanadrasoa (1892–1931), poet, novelist and journal editor

References 

Malagasy
Writers
Malagasy